During the 2009–10 season, the Guildford Flames participated in the semi-professional English Premier Ice Hockey League. It was the 18th year of ice hockey played by the Guildford Flames and the third season under Paul Dixon as head coach.

After a disappointing season in 2008–2009, Paul Dixon decided to shake up the Flames roster during the off-season. British netminders Joe Watkins and Alex Mettam, Canadian forward Taras Foremsky, Czech forward Martin Bouz, and British forward Ollie Bronnimann all were released. British defenceman Stephen Lee also left the Surrey-based outfit after he accepted an offer from the Nottingham Panthers, however a replacement was found in Newcastle Vipers defenceman Jez Lundin. The Flames re-signed Milos Melicherik on 1 May and gave him the added responsibility of being the new head coach of the under-18 side. Nathan Rempel and Gary Clarke both joined the club. The much anticipated final import signing of Martin Masa was confirmed in August.

The club confirmed in September that the Guildford Flames had begun the season with nearly 50 more season ticket holders than ever before – approaching 600.

Roster
Management
CEO  Rob Hepburn
Commercial Manager  Kirk Humphreys
Financial Controller  Thomas Hepburn

Coaching Staff
Head coach  Paul Dixon
Assistant/equipment manager  Dave Wiggins
Assistant coach/bench coach  Milos Melicherik

Goaltenders
1  Mark Lee
30  Dean Skinns

Forwards
8  Rob Lamey
12  Adrian Saul
14  Stuart Potts
16  Nathan Rempel
17  Ricky Plant
18  Lubomir Hurtaj
19  Tom Duggan
21  Milos Melicherik
23  Gary Clarke
25  Vaclav Zavoral
28  Martin Masa
32  Lukas Smital*

Defenders
4  Neil Liddiard
6  David Savage
22  Paul Dixon
37  Ben Austin
44  Nick Cross
55  Rick Skene
82  Jez Lundin

League table

The top eight teams progress to two-leg play-off quarter-finals (1st vs 8th, 2nd vs 7th, 3rd vs 6th, 4th vs 5th). Ties take place on 3 and 4 April with the higher seeded team given choice of home-leg date.

[*] Secured a playoff berth. [**] EPL League champions

 Milton Keynes Lightning are the 2009–2010 English Premier League champions.

Premier Cup table

Top 4 teams progress to 2-leg semi-finals (1st vs 4th, 2nd vs 3rd).

[*] Secured Semi-final Berth.

Premier Cup Finals

Aggregate Scores

 Guildford Flames are the 2009–2010 English Premier Cup Champions.

Playoffs

Aggregate Scores for quarter-finals

 Slough Jets are the EPL Playoff Winners 09/10

Results
Legend:

September

October

November

December

January

10th @ Bracknell was postponed to 18 February due to adverse weather conditions.

February

March

April

Points for the 2009/10 season
Final Points Standings

Goaltender Stats 2009/10
Final Standings

Special teams

Penalty Shots 09/10

Final Standings

Skaters

Goaltenders

End of Season Awards
The traditional End of Season Awards dinner was held on Monday 29 March 2010. The following awards were given out:

Most Sportsman like – #19 Tom Duggan/#37 Ben Austin

British Player of the year – #82 Jez Lundin

Players Player of the year – #28 Martin Masa

Top Point Scorer – #28 Martin Masa

The GIHSC (Guildford Ice Hockey Supporters Club) Voted the following:

Supporters British Player of the year – #19 Tom Duggan

Supporters Player of the year – #28 Martin Masa

External links
Official Guildford Flames website
Flames Backburner Site (supporters club)

Gui
Guildford Flames seasons